Malmheim og Soma is a borough of the city of Sandnes in the west part of the large municipality of Sandnes in Rogaland county, Norway.  The  borough sits in the western part of the municipality and it has a population of 1,597. It was created in 2011 when the old boroughs of Malmheim and Soma were merged.  The Julabygda Chapel is located in the small village of Julebygda in this borough.

References

Boroughs and neighbourhoods of Sandnes